Nancy Drolet (born August 2, 1973) is a Canadian ice hockey player, international public speaker and philanthropist. She is the daughter of Denis Drolet and Viviane Dubé. Nancy has won 6 gold medals for Canada with the Canadian women's hockey team. Drolet was named Sports Federation Canada Junior Athlete of the Year in 1992. After her Olympic career, she started traveling the world and giving conferences in schools. Nancy is famous for her phrase  School is the foundation of every child.

Playing career
Drolet was also an accomplished softball player and was a member of the Canadian National Softball team in 1990 and 1991. Drolet played for Team Quebec at the 1991 Canada Winter Games and was also a member of the Vancouver Griffins. Drolet played for the Sherbrooke Jofa-Titan squad in the League Régionale du Hockey au Féminin in the province of Québec. In 1994, Drolet would become the team captain, and its general manager.

She won a silver medal at the Nagano Olympic Games in Japan and played for her country in six world championships.  She twice scored goals in overtime to help Canada to wins in the 1997 and 2000 world championships. In doing so, became the first person in the history of the IIHF Women's World Hockey Championships to score two gold medal clinching goals in overtime. She accomplished the feats on April 6, 1997 and April 9, 2000.   During the 1999-2000 season, Nancy Drolet played for the Sainte-Julie Pantheres  and scored 29 goals and added 17 assists. She played also for Vancouver Griffins (2001–02 and 2002–03).

After her career in female hockey representing Canada, she gave many conferences where she educated hundreds of thousands of kids in schools across the country on environmental issues, health issues, and personal development. She also participated in multiple conferences internationally when it comes to subjects of health, athletic therapy, motivation, etc.   Nancy became an entrepreneur in the physical therapy field and owned multiple clinics across the province.  During the covid pandemic, she was one of the first people to become a Health and social services assistant when the Canadian forces were sent in to assist the crisis at the beginning of the pandemic.

Awards and honours
1993 Junior Athlete of the Year (selected by the Sports Federation of Canada)

Personal life 
In 1994, she married her long-time partner Natalie Allaire in Quebec. Nancy and Natalie have one child together. Nancy has always traveled throughout her career and is looking to plant her roots with her long-time partner Natalie in Rosemont-La Petite-Patrie.

Drolet ran for the Liberal Party of Canada in the 2021 Canadian federal election in the riding of Rosemont—La Petite-Patrie.

References 

1973 births
Living people
Canadian women's ice hockey forwards
French Quebecers
Ice hockey people from Quebec
Ice hockey players at the 1998 Winter Olympics
Lesbian sportswomen
LGBT ice hockey players
Canadian LGBT sportspeople
Liberal Party of Canada candidates for the Canadian House of Commons
Medalists at the 1998 Winter Olympics
Olympic ice hockey players of Canada
Olympic medalists in ice hockey
Sportspeople from Drummondville
Olympic silver medalists for Canada
Canadian sportsperson-politicians